European route E26 is a part of the trans-European road network. The route lies entirely within Germany and extends from Hamburg to Berlin, following sections of the A 24 and A 111 Autobahns.

External links 
 UN Economic Commission for Europe: Overall Map of E-road Network (2007)

26
E026
E026
E026
E026
E026